Lower Coverdale is a settlement in Albert County, New Brunswick. It is located near Riverview, Moncton, and Dieppe.

Education
 Riverview Middle School (buses carry students from Lower Coverdale to Riverview)
 Riverview High School (buses carry students from Lower Coverdale to Riverview)

History

Located on W side of the Petitcodiac River, 6.7 km ESE of Upper Coverdale: Coverdale Parish, Albert County: PO 1847-1918 was located at the mouth of Turtle Creek: in 1866 Coverdale was a farming community with about 30 families: John Leeman, Edward Price and R.P. Scutell operated mills here: in 1871 Coverdale had a population of 250: in 1973 Coverdale was incorporated as a town and was amalgamated with Riverview Heights, Gunningsville and Bridgedale: renamed Riverview in 1974.

Notable people

See also
List of communities in New Brunswick
Greater Moncton

Bordering communities

References

Settlements in New Brunswick
Communities in Albert County, New Brunswick
Communities in Greater Moncton